"One Man Band" is a song recorded by American country music band Old Dominion. It was released in June 2019 as the second single from their self-titled third studio album. The song peaked at No. 20 on the Billboard Hot 100, becoming their highest charting single.

History
Lead singer Matthew Ramsey said that the idea for the song came to him just before a concert. He wrote the song with band members Trevor Rosen and Brad Tursi, and frequent collaborator Josh Osborne. The song uses the concept of a one-man band as a metaphor for a man who wants to have a committed relationship instead of living alone. Ramsey describes it as the band's "first love song", and notes that the lyrics have a double meaning that he feels can also refer to his relationship with his bandmates.

Commercial performance
"One Man Band" reached No. 1 on Billboards Country Airplay on chart dated December 14, 2019. It was certified Gold by the RIAA on September 17, 2019 for half a million units in sales and streams. The song has sold 278,000 copies in the United States as of March 2020.

Charts

Weekly charts

Year-end charts

Certifications

References

2019 singles
2019 songs
Country ballads
2010s ballads
Old Dominion (band) songs
RCA Records Nashville singles
Songs written by Matthew Ramsey
Songs written by Trevor Rosen
Songs written by Brad Tursi
Songs written by Josh Osborne
Song recordings produced by Shane McAnally